Darryl le Roux (born 30 October 1956) is a South African cricketer. He played in 55 first-class and 21 List A matches from 1975/76 to 1992/93.

References

External links
 

1956 births
Living people
South African cricketers
Boland cricketers
Free State cricketers
Western Province cricketers
North West cricketers
Cricketers from Bloemfontein